The group of Turkic people who are of Indo-Aryan descent are commonly known as the Indo-Turks or Indo-Turkic.  They are sometimes categorised as Romanis, but this claim is largely false.  Many Indo-Turks live in Central Asia and Russia.

Indian Subcontinent
The ancestors of the Indo-Turkic people, are Turks who migrated to South Asia at the time of the Delhi Sultanate and the Mughal Empire and intermarried with Indians. The Delhi Sultanate is a term used to cover five short-lived, Delhi-based kingdoms two of which were of Turkic origin in medieval India namely the Mamluk dynasty (Delhi) and Tughlaq dynasty. Other Turkic dynasties which ruled in South Asia include Ghaznavids, Mughal Empire, and Nawabs of Bengal and Murshidabad.
Southern India also saw Turkic origin dynasties like the Qutb Shahi dynasty. There is also a significant population of Indo-Turkic descendants known as Rowther, mostly found in Southern India.

Ottoman Empire 
They are also Indian nomads who went to Central Asia in the Middle Ages, where they intermingled with Turkic people, and called by the host countries where they live in as Lyuli, Multani or Bombay etc. Some of them went trough Caucasus and settled in Anatolia Eyalet, like the Abdal of Turkey, other went to Rumelia Eyalet and Crimean Khanate.

Indian Muslims Merchants went in waves from 1750 - 1857 from Hindustan to the Ottoman Empire, settled there and intermarried with Ottoman Turks who intermingled then with the Muslim Roma

Notable dynasties
Ghaznavids
Khilji dynasty
Mamluk dynasty (Delhi)
Tughlaq dynasty
Qutb Shahi dynasty
Adil Shahi dynasty*
Mughal Empire
Nawabs of Bengal and Murshidabad

See also 
 Abdal of Turkey
 Lyuli
 Rowther

References 

Muslim communities of India